Peter Power may refer to:
 Peter Power (politician) (born 1966), Irish politician
 Peter Power (crisis management specialist) (born 1951), British

See also
Peter Powers, hypnotist